Bournheath is a village and civil parish in the Bromsgrove District of Worcestershire, England, about three miles north of Bromsgrove.  According to the 2001 census it had a population of 454.

References

Villages in Worcestershire